All Time Gospel Favorites is the fortieth solo studio album by American country music singer-songwriter Loretta Lynn. It was released in August 1997, by Heartland Music. It was only sold for a limited time. It was re-released on May 25, 2004, by Time Life Records, in an abbreviated 20 track edition with new cover art. Time Life Records would release a 10 track edition on April 24, 2012, with the same cover art as the 2004 edition.

All Time Gospel Favorites was the first album Lynn recorded following the death of her husband, Oliver Lynn, in August 1996. It is an album of gospel songs, some are new versions of songs Lynn had previously recorded on her three gospel albums, Hymns (1965), Who Says God Is Dead! (1968), and God Bless America Again (1972), and some are new songs that Lynn had not previously recorded.

Track listing

Personnel
Adapted from the album liner notes.

 Ira Pittelman - Executive Producer
 Jerry Kennedy for JK Productions, Inc. - Producer
 Ronny Light - Engineer
 Bergen White - String arrangements

Musicians:
 Jimmy Capps, Pat Flynn, Jerry Kennedy, Pete Wade - guitar
 Sonny Garrish - steel guitar
 Mike Leech - bass
 Gene Chrisman - drums
 Hargus "Pig" Robbins - keyboards
 Charlie McCoy - harmonica
 Jerry Kennedy - Dobro
 Carl Gorodetzky, Pamela Sixfin, Lee Larrison, Alan Umstead, Conni Ellisor, Gary Vanosdale, James Grosjean, Kristin Wilkinson, Robert Mason - strings
 Glen Duncan - fiddle, mandolin
 The Jordanaires (Gordon Stoker, Neal Matthews, Duane West, Ray Walker), Millie Kirkham, Bergen White, Cindy Walker, Bob Bailey, Vicki Hampton - backing vocals

References

Loretta Lynn albums
1997 albums
albums produced by Jerry Kennedy